Beaver Creek is a stream in the U.S. state of Ohio. It is a tributary of Raccoon Creek.

Beaver Creek was named for the beaver dams along its course.

See also
List of rivers of Ohio

References

Rivers of Gallia County, Ohio
Rivers of Ohio